Ja'far ibn Aqil was the son of Aqil ibn Abi Talib, and his mother was Umm Thaqr bint Amir who was from Bani Kilab. Meanwhile, he was the son-in-law of Ali.

Ja'far is considered as one of Husayn's companions; he entered the battlefield after Abd Allah ibn Muslim, and he killed 2 (or 15) fighters of the army of Umar ibn Sa'd. He was killed by Bishr ibn Sawt al-Hamdani or Khalid ibn Asad al-Johani in (the battle of) Karbala on the day of Ashura when he was with Husayn ibn Ali.

Ja'far ibn Aqil was reciting the following epic verses in the battlefield:

 "I am an Abtahi (Makki) young and I am Abu Talib's descendant, (I am) from the descendant of Hashim and Ghalib;
 and without doubt we are the master of grandee, this is Husayn the master of cleaners"

Additionally, the name of Ja'far ibn Aqil ibn Abi Talib has been mentioned in Ziyarah al-Nahiya al-Muqaddasa and also Ziyarah al-Rajabiyyah.

References 

Battle of Karbala
People killed at the Battle of Karbala
680 deaths
Husayn ibn Ali
Hussainiya